Amina Anshba and Anastasia Dețiuc were the defending champions but chose not to participate.

Anna Danilina and Valeriya Strakhova won the title, defeating Mirjam Björklund and Jaimee Fourlis in the final, 4–6, 7–5, [10–4].

Seeds

Draw

Draw

References
Main Draw

Reinert Open - Doubles